Ragnhild Margrethe Aamodt (born 9 September 1980, in Sarpsborg) is a Norwegian handball player. She currently plays for the Norwegian club Sarpsborg. Until March 2009 she also played for the Norwegian national team.

She made her debut on the Norwegian national team in 2002, and played 133 matches and scored 314 goals until her retirement on March 2009. She is a 3 time European champion, from 2004 to 2008. She received a silver medal at the 2007 World Women's Handball Championship and a gold medal at the 2008 Summer Olympics in Beijing.

References 

1980 births
Living people
Norwegian expatriate sportspeople in Denmark
Expatriate handball players
Handball players at the 2008 Summer Olympics
Olympic handball players of Norway
Norwegian female handball players
Olympic gold medalists for Norway
Olympic medalists in handball
Medalists at the 2008 Summer Olympics